meWATCH (stylized as mewatch) is a Singaporean digital video on demand service brand owned by Mediacorp. It was launched on 1 February 2013 as an over-the-top media service  and an entertainment and lifestyle website Toggle.

On 1 April 2015, xinmsn, an internet portal which is a joint venture between MediaCorp and Microsoft, was closed down and merged with Toggle. On 30 January 2020, Toggle was renamed meWATCH.

Content

meWATCH offers to worldwide audiences video streaming or on-demand content of programs from Mediacorp's archived library as well as original webseries. In addition, meWatch also offers live streaming of Mediacorp's free-to-air channels (exclusive to Singapore only). It also offers catch-up TV for viewers to watch shows they have missed on prime time TV shows from the previous few days.

In 2016, meWATCH (then Toggle) began to offer made-for-digital productions under the brand Toggle Originals. Certain original series, such as I Want to Be a Star may be telecasted on Mediacorp's television channels, typically in the late night programming slots.

In 2019, meWATCH began offering additional content from HBO Go for Singapore residents only. In the same year, Mediacorp and Wattpad inked partnership for developing scripted series and films for meWATCH and Mediacorp FTA channels, based on books made by Wattpad writers that are based in Singapore. In 30 May 2019, meWATCH began offering on-demand Korean movies from tvN Movies.

On 30 January 2020, Toggle was renamed meWATCH. At the same time, Mediacorp made a content deal with HOOQ to stream the latter's original content. However, on 27 March 2020, HOOQ filed for liquidation, shut down on 30 April 2020, and eventually was acquired by Coupang in July 2020 in order to being used as the basis of its streaming service named Coupang Play.

As of most recent, they had carried anime from both Medialink and Muse Communication, dozens of Mandarin series from Chinese production house, alongside with premium channels such as Animax + Gem, Simply South and newly launch Rock Entertainment (via Rock 24/7).

References

External links

Mediacorp
Subscription video on demand services
Streaming media systems
2013 establishments in Singapore